The United States Air Force's 206th Combat Communications Squadron (206 CBCS) was an Air National Guard combat communications unit located at Elmendorf AFB, Alaska.

Mission
The 206th Combat Communications Squadron's mission was to provide crucial information technology services worldwide.

History
The 206th Combat Communications Squadron (206 CBCS) can trace its distinguished history back to 1987 as the 176th Combat Communications Flight located on Kulis Air National Guard Base. Under this designation, the unit was charged with the support of a Collocated Operating Base (COB) within the NATO theater. During this period, the unit participated in various CONUS-based exercises in preparation for execution of the European mission.

In 1992, the military went through restructuring and due to the changing world situation the 206th Combat Communications Flight was formed to support the 11th Air Force during deployed wartime missions. The unit became a PACAF-gained combat communications unit effective 1 April 1993 and was relocated to Elmendorf Air Force Base.

On 1 July 1996, the unit was re-designated as the 206th Combat Communications Squadron. Over time, the unit's primary mission evolved to support Pacific theater communications requirements. The unit supported multiple missions and exercises across the Pacific theater.  The principal means of this support was through the employment of satellite communications providing connectivity for a suite of deployable communications and computer services.

In December 2001, shortly after the 9/11 tragedy, unit members volunteered to deploy to Southwest Asia to such places as Kuwait, Saudi Arabia, Qatar and the United Arab Emirates to participate in Operation ENDURING FREEDOM / SOUTHERN WATCH. While there, they endured many tense moments and austere conditions while providing excellent communications support to combat actions.

The unit was inactivated in March of 2008.

Assignments

Major Command/Gaining Command
Air National Guard/Pacific Air Forces (1992–2008)

Wing/Group
201st Combat Communications Group

Previous designations
206th Combat Communications Squadron (1 Jul 1996 – 31 Mar 2008)
206th Combat Communications Flight (1992–1996)
176th Combat Communications Flight (1987–1992)

Commanders
LtCol Jeffrey S. Campbell 11 Mar 2004 – 31 Mar 2008
Maj Renee S. Blake 20 Oct 2000 – 11 Mar 2004
LtCol Richard S. Johnson 1 Jul 1996 – 20 Oct 2000

Decorations
Air Force Outstanding Unit Award 
Order GA-6 1994 – Effective dates – 1 Jan 1993 – 31 Jul 1994
Order GA-32 1999 – Effective dates 1 Jan 1998 – 31 Aug 1999
Order GA-32 2002 – Effective dates 1 Sep 1999 – 30 Jul 2001
Order G-43 2006 – Effective dates 1 Jul 2003 – 30 Jun 2005
Order G-?? 2007 – Effective dates 31 Aug 2005 – 1 Sep 2007

References

Combat Communications 0206
Combat Communications 0206
Military units and formations in Alaska